Tai (Chinese:  or , Tái) was a former settlement in China during the Xia dynasty. It was located at the site of present-day Wugong in Shaanxi.

It was the ancestral home of the Ji clan, the future dynasty of Zhou. The Xia director of agriculture Buzhu removed his clan from there when he left his office and moved to live among the nomadic Rong and Di tribes.

References

Xia dynasty
History of Shaanxi